The Tour du Lac Léman was a professional one-day road cycling race held annually around Lake Geneva, Switzerland. The race has not been held since 2005.

Winners

References

Cycle races in Switzerland
UCI Europe Tour races
Recurring sporting events established in 1879
1879 establishments in Switzerland
Defunct cycling races in Switzerland